Leuconitocris patricia is a species of beetle in the family Cerambycidae. It was described by Chevrolat in 1858. It is known from Ivory Coast.

References

Endemic fauna of Ivory Coast
Leuconitocris
Beetles described in 1858